The men's 3000 metres steeplechase event at the 2007 Pan American Games was held on July 28.

Results

References
Official results

3000
2007